TPC may refer to:

Organizations
 Tax Policy Center, for US tax analysis
 Technology Professionals Canada
 Texas Professional Communicators
 Transaction Processing Performance Council, developing benchmark specifications for database systems
 Tropical Prediction Center, of the US National Hurricane Center
 TPC Group, a petrochemicals manufacturing company based in Houston, Texas, US
 Taiwan Police College, a police academy in Taiwan
  The Pokémon Company

Science and technology
 Table per Concrete Class, an inheritance strategy for Entity Framework
 Time projection chamber, a type of particle detector
 Tough-pitch copper, a type of copper cable
 Trans Pacific Cable, a series of Pacific Ocean undersea cables 
 Transmitter Power Control, for IEEE 802.11h-2003 WLAN
 Two-pore channel, an ion channel

Sports
 Tournament Players Championship, an earlier name of The Players Championship
 Tournament Players Championship (United Kingdom), a European Tour golf tournament 
 TPC at Sawgrass, US golf course
 Tournament Players Club, a chain of golf courses

Transportation
 Air Calédonie (ICAO code)
 Parenzana (reporting mark), Trieste - Poreč - Kanfanar railway 1902–1935
 Transports Publics du Chablais

Other uses
 Tokyo Police Club, an indie rock band from Canada
 The Perl Conference, now The Perl and Raku Conference